KIPP Pride High School is a 9–12th grade open-enrollment charter school founded in rural Gaston, North Carolina in 2005. It is part of KIPP (Knowledge is Power Program), a national network of charter schools.

References

Charter schools in North Carolina
Educational institutions established in 2005
Public high schools in North Carolina
Public middle schools in North Carolina
Schools in Northampton County, North Carolina
2005 establishments in North Carolina